The University of East Anglia's Creative Writing Course was founded by Sir Malcolm Bradbury and Sir Angus Wilson in 1970. The M.A. is widely regarded as the most prestigious and successful in the country  and competition for places is notoriously tough.

The course is split into four strands: Prose, Creative Non-Fiction, Poetry and Scriptwriting (which is Skillset accredited). All four result in an M.A. qualification upon successful completion of the course. The Course Directors are currently Andrew Cowan, Kathryn Hughes, Lavinia Greenlaw and Val Taylor respectively. Course tutors include Amit Chaudhuri, Trezza Azzopardi, Giles Foden, Tobias Jones, James Lasdun, Jean McNeil, Margaret Atwood and George Szirtes.

Writers such as Angela Carter, Rose Tremain, Andrew Motion, W. G. Sebald, Michèle Roberts and Patricia Duncker have also taught on the course.

Writers-in-residence have included Alan Burns and Margaret Atwood.

Notable alumni

Nobel Prize winners
 Kazuo Ishiguro (MA, 1980), 2017 Nobel Prize in Literature laureate

Booker Prize winners
  
Anne Enright (MA, 1987), 2007 Booker Prize winner for The Gathering
Kazuo Ishiguro (MA, 1980), 1989 Booker Prize winner for The Remains of the Day
Ian McEwan (MA, 1971), 1998 Booker Prize winner for AmsterdamCosta Book Award winners

Tash Aw (MA, 2003), Whitbread Book Award winner in the 2005 First Novel category for The Harmony Silk FactorySusan Fletcher (MA, 2002), Whitbread Book Award winner in the 2004 First Novel category for Eve GreenAdam Foulds (MA, 2000), Costa Book Award winner in the 2008 Poetry category for The Broken WordEmma Healey (MA, 2011), Costa Book Award winner in the 2014 First Novel category for Elizabeth is MissingAndrew Miller (MA, 1991), Costa Book Award winner in the 2011 Novel category for PureMonique Roffey (BA, 1987), Costa Book Award winner in the 2020 Novel category for The Mermaid of Black ConchChristie Watson (MA, 2009), Costa Book Award winner in the 2011 First Novel category for Tiny Sunbirds Far AwayWomen's Prize for Fiction winners
Naomi Alderman (MA, 2003), 2017 Women's Prize for Fiction winner for The PowerRose Tremain (BA, 1967), 2008 Women's Prize for Fiction winner for The Road HomeBetty Trask Award & Prize winners
Rowan Hisayo Buchanan (PHD, 2019) 2017 Betty Trask Award winner for Harmless Like YouSam Byers (MA, 2003; PHD, 2014) 2014 Betty Trask Award winner for IdiopathyAnthony Cartwright (BA, 1996) 2004 Betty Trask Award winner for The AfterglowHelen Cross (MA, 1997) 2002 Betty Trask Award winner for My Summer of LoveSuzannah Dunn (MA, 1989) 1991 Betty Trask Award winner for Quite ContrarySusan Elderkin (MA, 1994) 2000 Betty Trask Award winner for Sunset Over Chocolate MountainsDiana Evans (MA, 2003) 2005 Betty Trask Award winner for 26aSusan Fletcher (MA, 2002) 2005 Betty Trask Prize winner for Eve GreenAdam Foulds (MA, 2000) 2007 Betty Trask Award winner for The Truth About These Strange TimesImogen Hermes Gowar (MA, 2014) 2019 Betty Trask Award winner for The Mermaid and Mrs HancockEmma Healey (MA, 2011) 2015 Betty Trask Award winner for Elizabeth is MissingPaul Houghton (MA, 1987) 1989 Betty Trask Award winner for Harry's Last WeddingAnjali Joseph (MA, 2008; PHD, 2013) 2011 Betty Trask Prize winner for Saraswati ParkFrances Liardet (MA, 1998) 1994 Betty Trask Award winner for The GameNicola Monaghan (MA, 2018) 2006 Betty Trask Award winner for The Killing JarGlenn Patterson (MA, 1986) 1988 Betty Trask Award winner for Burning Your OwnNatasha Pulley (MA, 2012) 2017 Betty Trask Award winner for The Watchmaker of Filigree StreetPhil Whitaker (MA, 1996) 1998 Betty Trask Award winner for Eclipse of the SunJames Tait Black Memorial Prize winners
Ian McEwan (MA, 1971) James Tait Black Memorial Prize winner in the 2005 Fiction category for SaturdayAndrew Miller (MA, 1991) James Tait Black Memorial Prize winner in the 1997 Fiction category for Ingenious PainRose Tremain (BA, 1967) James Tait Black Memorial Prize winner in the 1993 Fiction category for Sacred Country''

Other alumni
  
Nicholas Allan (MA, 1981), children's author
Mona Arshi (MA, 2012), Forward Prize-winning poet
Trezza Azzopardi (MA, 1998), novelist
Martyn Bedford (MA, 1994), novelist
Brett Ellen Block (MA, 1998), author
Peter Bowker (MA, 1991), screenwriter
John Boyne (MA, 1996), novelist
Aifric Campbell (MA, 2003), writer
Tracy Chevalier (MA, 1994), historical novelist
Judy Corbalis (MA, 1990), novelist
Andrew Cowan (MA, 1985), novelist
Fflur Dafydd (MA, 2000), writer
Donna Daley-Clarke (MA, 2001), novelist
Louise Doughty (MA, 1987), novelist
Joe Dunthorne (MA, 2005), novelist
Oliver Emanuel (MA, 2002), playwright
Stephen Finucan (MA, 1996), short story writer
David Flusfeder (MA, 1988), author
Bo Fowler (MA, 1995), novelist
Ruth Gilligan (MA, 2011), writer
Tim Guest (MA, 1999), author
Stephanie Hale (MA, 1993), writer
Mohammed Hanif (MA, 2005), writer
Jane Harris (MA, 1992), novelist and screenwriter
Alix Hawley (MA, 2002), novelist
Kathryn Hughes (MA, 1987), historian
Naomi Ishiguro (MA, 2018), short story writer and novelist
Mick Jackson (MA, 1992), novelist
Christopher James (MA, 2000), poet
Panos Karnezis (MA, 2000), novelist
Larissa Lai (MA, 2001), novelist
Hernán Lara Zavala (MA 1981), novelist
Joanna Laurens (MA, 2003), playwright
Ágnes Lehóczky (MA, 2006), poet
Toby Litt (MA, 1995), novelist
Philip MacCann (MA), writer
Deirdre Madden (MA, 1985), novelist
Robert McGill (MA, 2002), writer
Sarah Emily Miano (MA, 2002), author
Neel Mukherjee (MA, 2001), writer
Paul Murray (MA, 2001), novelist
Sandra Newman (MA, 2002), writer
Kathy Page (MA, 1988), novelist
Christine Pountney (MA, 1997), author
Dina Rabinovitch (MA, 2000), journalist and writer
Ben Rice (MA, 2000), novelist
Eliza Robertson (MA, 2012), author
Tom Saunders (MA, 1987), author
Anthony Sattin (MA, 1984), writer
Simon Scarrow (MA, 1992), author
James Scudamore (MA, 2004), novelist
Owen Sheers (MA, 1998), author, poet and playwright
Jeremy Sheldon (MA, 1996), novelist
Robert Sheppard (MA, 1979), poet
Kathryn Simmonds (MA, 2002), poet
Rob Magnuson Smith (MA 2010), novelist
Paul Stewart (MA, 1979), writer
Julia Stuart (MA, 2013), novelist
Todd Swift (MA, 2004), poet
Rebecca Tamás (PHD, 2017), poet and essayist
Sharlene Teo (MA, 2013), novelist
Mark Tilton (MA, 1997), screenwriter
Carol Topolski (MA, 2004), novelist
Erica Wagner (MA, 1991), author and literary editor of The Times
Craig Warner (MA, 2013), playwright and screenwriter
Matt Whyman (MA, 1992), novelist
Clare Wigfall (MA, 2000), writer
Luke Williams (MA, 2002), author
D. W. Wilson (MA, 2010), author
Jennifer Wong (MA, 2009), writer and poet
Yan Ge (MA, 2020), novelist

External links
 UEA Creative Writing webpages

References

UEA Creative Writing Course
Creative writing programs